The 1950 World Snooker Championship was a snooker tournament held at the Tower Circus in Blackpool, England.

For the fourth year running the final was contested by Fred Davis and Walter Donaldson. Donaldson defeated Davis 51–46 to win his second and last world title. Donaldson won the 7th frame of the final day to lead 49–42 with only 6 frames to play. Davis made a break of 101 in frame 46 of his semi-final match against George Chenier.

Schedule
Source:

Main draw 
Sources:

Qualifying 
The qualifying contest was held at an 18-table hall in Battersea, London from 17 October to 12 November 1949. Kingsley Kennerley met John Barrie in the first match. Kennerley won the first five frames and led 15–9 after two days. He won the first three frames on the final day to take a winning 18–9 lead, eventually winning 21–14. Willie Smith met Bill Withers in the second match of the week. Willie Smith led 10–2 after the first day and took an 18–4 lead on the second day. The final score was 28–7. After a 3-day break Sydney Lee met Conrad Stanbury. Lee led 15–9 after two days and won 20–15. Herbert Holt met Dickie Laws in the last quarter-final match. Holt led 17–7 after two days and eventually won 26–9. Kennerley met Willie Smith in the first semi-final and led 16–8 after two days. Kennerley won 22–13. Sydney Lee and Herbert Holt met in the second semi-final. Lee led 7–5 after the first day and 16–8 after the second day. Holt then got influenza and conceded the match. Kennerley met Lee in the final. Lee took a 4–2 lead but Kennerley led 7–5 overnight. Kennerley then extended his lead to 14–10.

References

1950
World Snooker Championship
World Snooker Championship
World Snooker Championship